Global Underground 015: Darren Emerson, Uruguay is a DJ mix album in the Global Underground series, compiled and mixed by Darren Emerson. The mix is a retrospective look at a set at the La Morocha club in Punta del Este, Uruguay.

A popular techno and deep house DJ for many years in his own right, Darren Emerson’s global profile had gone stellar with the huge success of Underworld, particularly following their chart-bothering re-release of Born Slippy. While making this mix out in Uruguay, on an afternoon stroll along the beach, Darren dropped the bombshell to GU's Andy that he was thinking of leaving the band.
Andy tried to persuade him otherwise - at least until the album was out - but his mind was made up and the story was soon to break in the dance media anyway. Darren's departure was a big shock to his fans, but it made his debut GU mix one of his first public statements after the decision. As such, it became symbolic of his solo intent.

It’s a bold and tasty showcase of Emerson the club DJ, taking GU into deeper techno territory than it had gone before, while still joining the dots in terms of progression and an expansive musical vision. The prog purists of the day, who were still enraptured by the recent Digweed and Sasha GU mixes, were a little fazed by this one. However, Darren holds his own superbly over both CDs, introducing the likes of Speedy J and Dave Clarke to new ears.

Track listing

Disc one
 The Orb - "A Huge Ever Growing Pulsating Brain That Rules From the Centre of the Ultraworld" – 7:31
 Holy Ghost - "Twister" – 4:34
 Trevor Rockcliffe - "Take a Chance" – 4:10
 HALO & Hipp E - "Funk Your Body" – 3:29
 Chaser - "Tall Stories" – 5:32
 Combustible - "Carnival" – 4:56
 Bert Dunk - "Groove Y'all" – 4:11
 Meeker - "Save Me" – 6:09
 Saints & Sinners - "Pushin' Too Hard" – 7:23
 Deetron - "Decipher Language" – 5:55
 Speedy J - "Rise" – 4:41
 Dave Angel - "Rematch" – 3:57
 Ron Trent - "Altered States" – 7:51

Disc two
 Paul Jacobs - "Soul Grabber Part 3" – 4:02
 David Duriez - "Plastic Music" – 2:00
 Genetic Grooves - "Cloud 99" – 1:45
 Aaron Carl - "Dance Naked" – 6:44
 Freelance Science - "Can U Feel Tha Funk" – 4:09
 Lil' Louis & the World - "French Kiss" – 4:54
 Sixteen B - "It Doesn't Have to End" – 4:18
 Anti Trance Terrorists - "Pig Jam" – 2:41
 Dave Clarke - "The Compass" – 4:34
 Christian Smith - "Mojito" – 1:51
 Pascal F.E.O.S. - "I Can Feel That" – 6:34
 Plastic Avengers - "Chukus Mahunkus" – 2:01
 Sound Stream - "Let's Break" – 4:39
 Reaver - "Electrophonic" – 4:47
 Westbam - "Mr. Peanut" – 3:33
 Changing Shape - "M" – 3:06
 Paul Rutherford - "Get Real" – 5:54

References

External links 

Darren Emerson albums
2000 albums
Global Underground
DJ mix albums